Michael E. Malinowski (born in 1948, Chicago) is a member of the Senior Foreign Service, was the U.S. Ambassador to Nepal from 10/26/2001 to 01/31/2007.  He was also Chargé d'Affaires ad interim in the Philippines from July 2000 until September 2001. Before he joined the Foreign Service, he was a social worker and teacher.

Malinowski was the US Consul in Kabul at the time of Ambassador Spike Dubs murder and was one of the people to rush to the hotel where he was being held after his kidnapping and before his death.

His social work job was a way to help him pay for his education at Loyola University Chicago.

References

Living people
1948 births
American consuls
United States Foreign Service personnel
Ambassadors of the United States to Nepal
Ambassadors of the United States to the Philippines
American social workers
Loyola University Chicago alumni
21st-century American diplomats